Matt Jess (born 4 April 1984) is a rugby union player who most notably played for Exeter Chiefs in the Aviva Premiership. His position of choice was Wing. Matt made his debut against Moseley in 2008.  He attended Cape Cornwall School in St Just, Cornwall.

Despite being born in Coventry, Jessy spent the majority of his youth in Cornwall and considers himself Cornish and is even branded as the "Heamoor Flyer". Jess joined Exeter on 28 May 2008, signing from Launceston. Jess played his 100th game for Exeter against Worcester Warriors in March 2013.

He is currently playing for Taunton R.F.C.

References

External links
 Exeter Player Profile
Aviva Premiership Player Profile

1984 births
Living people
Rugby union players from Coventry
Exeter Chiefs players
Cornish Pirates players
Rugby union wings